This article contains a list films produced in Pakistan in the year 1992 and in the Urdu language:

1992

See also
1992 in Pakistan

External links
 Search Pakistani film - IMDB.com

1992
Pakistani
Films